Zvejniekciems Station is a railway station on the Zemitāni–Skulte Railway. It began serving electrified trains as a terminus in 1971. In 1991, with the extension of electrification to Skulte, the terminus station was transformed into a waypoint.

References 

Railway stations in Latvia